The railway line from Budapest to Záhony via Szolnok, Debrecen and Nyíregyháza is Hungarian State Railways line 100. The northern section, from Nyíregyháza to Záhony, is designated 100b.

From Szolnok there is a rail connection to Budapest. The Szolnok - Záhony line has become known for the so-called Fekete vonat (black train) which brings labourers to the capital and has been the scene of fights.

History 
The initial 98-km segment between Pest and Szolnok was built by the Magyar Középponti Vasút (Central Hungarian Railway) and opened on 1 September 1847. Construction was interrupted by the 1848-49 war of independence and was resumed by the newly formed Tiszavidéki Vasút (Theiss Railway). The Szolnok - Debrecen segment opened on 25 November 1857 and the segment from Debrecen to Miskolc via Nyíregyháza on 24 May 1859. Since January 1855, the ownership and operations-right of the section Budapest–Szolnok had been obtained by the Imperial Royal Privileged Austrian State Railway Company (StEG) in the association with constructing the section Szeged–Temesvár.

References

Sources

Links 

Railway lines in Hungary
Railway lines opened in 1847
1847 establishments in the Austrian Empire